Barbara Ann Baird (born 1951) is an American cell biologist and biophysicist.

Education and career
Baird completed a bachelor's of science degree in chemistry at Knox College, graduating in 1973. She obtained a doctorate in the subject at Cornell University, where she later held the Horace White Professorship.

Honors
Baird was awarded a Guggenheim fellowship in 1993, and is a fellow of the American Association for the Advancement of Science (2006) and American Academy of Arts and Sciences (2008).

References

1951 births
American women biologists
Cornell University faculty
Cornell University alumni
20th-century American women scientists
Living people
Fellows of the American Academy of Arts and Sciences
Fellows of the American Association for the Advancement of Science
Knox College (Illinois) alumni
21st-century American women scientists
Cell biologists
Women biophysicists
American biophysicists
20th-century American biologists
21st-century American biologists
20th-century American physicists
21st-century American physicists
American women physicists